Pygmy mouse may refer to:
Baiomys, a North American genus:
Northern pygmy mouse (Baiomys taylori)
Southern pygmy mouse (Baiomys musculus)
Nannomys, an African subgenus:
Desert pygmy mouse (Mus indutus)
African pygmy mouse, South African Pygmy Mouse, or just Pygmy Mouse (Mus minutoides)
Subsaharan pygmy mouse (Mus musculoides)
Free State pygmy mouse (Mus orangiae)
Setzer's pygmy mouse (Mus setzeri)
Thomas's pygmy mouse (Mus sorella)
Gray-bellied pygmy mouse (Mus triton)
Pygmy mouse (mutant) (pg), a mutant strain of the laboratory mouse

Animal common name disambiguation pages